Patrick George McShane (18 April 1858 – 11 December 1903) was an Australian cricketer who played in three Test matches between 1885 and 1888.

Life and career
McShane is rare in that he was a Test match umpire before he played in a Test match. He was selected to be twelfth man for Australia in the Test against England in Sydney in March 1885, but after several nominated umpires declined or were rejected by the teams, he was asked to umpire. Australia won the match by eight wickets after George Bonnor scored a century in 100 minutes, the fastest in Test matches to that time. McShane's colleague was Ted Elliott.

McShane was then selected for the Test in Melbourne the following week, making 9 and 12 not out. He played in two more Tests against England in the 1887–88 season, failing with the bat – his last three innings were ducks – and taking only one wicket.

He was a left-handed batsman who played in 36 first-class matches, most of them for Victoria, between 1880/81 and 1892/93.  He scored 1117 runs at an average of 18.31 with a highest score of 88. As a left-arm medium-pace bowler he took 72 wickets at an average of 25.36 with best figures of 9/45 in an innings.  He also took 24 catches.

McShane also captained the Fitzroy Football Club in the VFA. After his sporting career ended, McShane was employed as curator at St Kilda Cricket Club's ground, but became mentally ill and was admitted to Kew Asylum. After two years there he died in December 1903, leaving a widow and a large family.

See also
List of Test cricket umpires
List of Victoria first-class cricketers

References

Sources
 Pollard, Jack, Australian Cricket: 1803–1893, The Formative Years. Sydney, The Book Company, 1995.
 Pollard, Jack, Australian Cricket: The game and the players. Sydney, Hodder & Stoughton, 1982.

External links
 

1858 births
1903 deaths
Australia Test cricketers
Australian Test cricket umpires
Victoria cricketers
Australian cricketers
Cricketers from Geelong
Geelong Football Club (VFA) players
Fitzroy Football Club (VFA) players
Australian rules footballers from Geelong